Marguerite Durand (24 January 1864 – 16 March 1936) was a French stage actress, journalist, and a leading suffragette. She founded her own newspaper, and ran for election. She is also known for having a pet lion. For her contributions to the women's suffrage movement in France, the Bibliothèque Marguerite Durand was named in her honor.

Biography
Born into a middle-class family, Marguerite Durand was sent to study at a Roman Catholic convent. After finishing her primary education, she entered the Conservatoire de Paris before joining the Comédie Française in 1881.

In 1888, she gave up her career in the theatre to marry an up-and-coming young lawyer, Georges Laguerre. A friend and follower of the politically ambitious army general Georges Boulanger, her husband introduced her to the world of radical populist politics and involved her in writing pamphlets for the "Boulangists" movement. However, the marriage was short-lived and in 1891 the couple separated after which Durand took a job writing for Le Figaro, the leading newspaper of the day. In 1896, the paper sent her to cover the Congrès Féministe International (International Feminist Congress) ostensibly to write a humorous article. She came away from the event a greatly changed person, so much so that the following year on 9 December 1897 she founded a feminist daily newspaper, La Fronde to pick up where Hubertine Auclert's La Citoyenne left off.

Durand's newspaper, run exclusively by women, advocated for women's rights, including admission to the Bar association and the École des Beaux-Arts. This included, later in 1910, Durand's  attempt to organize female candidates for the legislative elections. At the 1900 World's Fair in Paris, she organized the Congress For The Rights of Women. As well as establishing a summer residence for female journalists in Pierrefonds in the Picardy region, Durand turned to activism for working women, helping to organize several trade unions.

Marguerite Durand, consumed by a passion for the equality of women, was an attractive woman of style and elegance who was famous for walking the streets of Paris with her pet lion she named "Tiger." Instrumental in the establishing of the zoological Cimetière des Chiens in the Parisian suburb of Asnières-sur-Seine where her lion was eventually interred, her activism raised the profile of feminism in France and Europe to an unprecedented level of respectability.

Library
In the course of her life and activism she compiled an enormous collection of papers that she gave to the government in 1931. The following year, the Bibliothèque Marguerite Durand opened in Paris and still operates as a specialized public library run by the Paris municipal library system, where researchers can work beneath a portrait of Durand.

References

Further reading

External links

French stage actresses
French feminists
19th-century French journalists
20th-century French journalists
French newspaper founders
French suffragists
Community activists
1864 births
1936 deaths
Journalists from Paris
Burials at Batignolles Cemetery
Republican-Socialist Party politicians
French socialist feminists
19th-century French actresses
French women company founders
Troupe of the Comédie-Française
International Congress of Women people
20th-century French women politicians
Le Figaro people